L'Aquila–Preturo Airport , is an airport serving L'Aquila, a city and comune of the Abruzzo region in central Italy.  The airport is also known as Parchi Airport, Preturo Airport (for the village at which it is located), and more complete combinations such as Aeroporto dei Parchi di I'Aquila Preturo. 

Facilities

G8
Following the earthquake that hit L'Aquila in 2009, the airport has played a key role in rescue operations. Hence, for example, helicopters evacuated more than 150 persons from San Salvatore Hospital. Before the G8 summit, the structure has been renewed and served by an adequate road system. The airport has been equipped with a parking lot and new buildings, including the Italian Civil Aviation Authority headquarters. PAPI and NDB systems have been installed and runway lighting was provided. During the G8, 146 aircraft, 2544 people and 37 delegations used the L'Aquila–Preturo Airport.
Afterwards, the airport was declared fit to civil traffic.
On 24 August 2011, the airport has been officially certified as Second Class according to International Civil Aviation Organization rules; it can operate with aircraft up to 12 mt. long, seating 20 to 42 persons.

Recent developments
In April 2015, the Italian authority for civil aviation (ENAC) declared the airport closed to commercial flights. The decision came out by the fact that the air traffic never concretized in a certain way. The airport remains open for private flights.

See also

List of airports in Italy

References

External links
  Aeroporto dei Parchi - Preturo
  Aero Club L'Aquila, former airport operator

Airports in Italy
Transport in Abruzzo
Buildings and structures in Abruzzo